is a Japanese light novel series written by Chirolu and initially illustrated by Truffle until volume 2 where Kei assumed the illustration of the series. It began serialization online in August 2014 on the user-generated novel publishing website Shōsetsuka ni Narō. It was later acquired by Hobby Japan, who have published nine volumes since February 2015 under their HJ Novels imprint. The series is published in English by J-Novel Club.

A manga adaptation with art by Hota has been serialized online via Kadokawa Shoten's ComicWalker website since July 2016 and has been collected in six tankōbon volumes. The manga is licensed in North America by Seven Seas Entertainment. An anime television series adaptation by Maho Film aired from July to September 2019.

Plot
Dale is a highly skilled adventurer who has made quite a name for himself despite his youth. One day on a job deep in the forest, he comes across a little devil girl named Latina who has almost wasted away. Unable to just leave her there to die, Dale takes her home and becomes her adoptive father.

Characters

An 18 year old young adventurer. While subduing demon beasts, he finds Latina in the forest and becomes Latina's adoptive father. He is a cool and brilliant adventurer, but in front of Latina, he loves her very much.

He later gains a devil's lifespan, ensuring he can live long as Latina; a benefit of being her official protector.

A devil girl found in the forest and raised by Dale. Her background is unknown. She is very honest, gentle and intelligent. She is an idol among "Dancing Tabby Cat" customers although she cannot sing very well. Ribbons are tied to hide her horns.

After she grows up, Latina informs Dale that she loves him romantically; with the two getting married and having children.

Kenneth's wife. They both run a "Dancing Tabby Cat" business. She treats rude customer adventurers well and also provides information from the "Green God's Message Board" which controls the information.

The owner of the tavern and inn called "Dancing Tabby Cat" where adventurers gather. He is a former adventurer and Dale's longtime friend.

Latina's best friend. She is a beautiful girl who is the head of the children.

Latina's friend. He is a boy who is more mature than his age and is very worried about Latina.

Latina's other best friend. She has a pleasant personality and she is a little more mature than her age.

Latina's friend. He is a chubby boy with a gentle personality.

Latina's friend. He is a smart boy who can learn.

Media

Light novels

Manga

Anime
An anime television series adaptation was announced on February 20, 2019. The series was animated by Maho Film, with Takeyuki Yanase directing the series and Takao Yoshioka handling series composition. Miyako Nishida, Toshihide Masudate, and Kaho Deguchi designed the characters. The series aired from July 4 to September 19, 2019 on Tokyo MX, BS11, GYT, and J:COM TV. It has been licensed for simulcast on Crunchyroll outside Asia, Muse Communication licensed the series in Southeast Asia and South Asia. The series ran for 12 episodes. Kanon Takao performed the series' opening theme song "I'm With You", while Nobuhiko Okamoto performed the series' ending theme song .

Reception
The light novel and manga series together have over 500,000 volumes in print. The light novel series ranked tenth in 2018 in Takarajimasha's annual light novel guide book Kono Light Novel ga Sugoi!, in the tankōbon category.

References

External links
  at Shōsetsuka ni Narō 
  
  
  
 

2015 Japanese novels
Adventure anime and manga
Anime and manga based on light novels
Fantasy anime and manga
Japanese webcomics
J-Novel Club books
Kadokawa Shoten manga
Light novels
Light novels first published online
Maho Film
Seinen manga
Seven Seas Entertainment titles
Shōsetsuka ni Narō
Slice of life anime and manga
Webcomics in print
Crunchyroll anime
Muse Communication